The Pingat Hassanal Bolkiah Sultan (Sultan Hassanal Bolkiah Medal) is an honorary medal of Brunei. The award is subdivided into two classes: the first class Darjah Pertama and the second class Darjah Kedua.

Recipients
 Crown Prince Al-Muhtadee Billah
 Queen Saleha
 Prince Mohamed Bolkiah
 Prince Jefri Bolkiah
 Prince Sufri Bolkiah
 Prince 'Abdul Mateen
 Princess Masna Bolkiah
 Besar Metassan
 Marianne Elisabeth Lloyd-Dolbey
 Alam Abdul Rahman
 Abdul Aziz Abu Bakar
 Abu Bakar Apong
 Jaya Rajid
 Isa Ibrahim

References

Orders, decorations, and medals of Brunei